Robert Kurt Deman is an American actor most famous for starring in the 1973 film Papillon as André Maturette. He also appeared in The Four Deuces (1975) starring Jack Palance and Carol Lynley, the TV movie Murder in Peyton Place (1977), and many popular television series of the 1970s, such as Cannon, starring William Conrad, The Blue Knight, starring George Kennedy and To Rome with Love, starring John Forsythe.

Filmography

References

External links 
 
 http://www.prisonflicks.com/reviews.php?filmID=62

Living people
Year of birth missing (living people)
American male television actors